Medical Student may refer to:
Someone studying at medical school
The Medical Student, a UK publication